Bonobos are an endangered species of apes.

Bonobos may also refer to:
 Bonobos (band), a Japanese rock band
 Bonobos (apparel), a men's apparel company

See also
 Bonobo (disambiguation)